The women's K-4 500 metres event was a fours kayaking event conducted as part of the Canoeing at the 1984 Summer Olympics program. This event debuted at these games.

Medalists

Final
With only seven crews entered, a final was held on August 11. This was the first time that less than nine competitors competed in a final at the Summer Olympics since the men's C-2 1000 m event at Melbourne in 1956. As of the 2020 Summer Olympics, it is the only canoeing event since 1956 that did not have eight or nine competitors or crews in the final.

In the official report, there was no time taken for the British team at the 250 m mark.

References
1984 Summer Olympics official report Volume 2, Part 2. p. 364. 
Sports-reference.com women's 1984 K-4 500 m results. 

Women's K-4 500
Olympic
Women's events at the 1984 Summer Olympics